Suvarnavathi Reservoir also called as Suvarnavathi Dam is located near Chamarajanagar, Karnataka, 14 km from Chamarajanagara town. The Dam is built across Suvarnavathi river which is a sub-river of Kaveri river. The dam is adjacent to the Punajanur state forest which serve as border between Karnataka and Tamil Nadu states.

Dam 
Suvarnavathi  Dam is located near Attugulipura village, Chamarajanagara Taluk, Karnataka, India. It is adjacent to Chamarajangara to Coimbatore National Highway 948, 14 km from Chamarajanagara town.

A reservoir across river Suvarnavathi was built in 1977 on the highway between Chamarajanagar-Coimbatore. Next to it is the Chikkahole Reservoir. These are called twin reservoirs. Both of them are in the back drop of beautiful nature. Fisheries and horticulture are the main occupation of this area. The added attraction of these reservoirs are seen in the wandering of wildlife all around. Suvarnavathi reservoir has a storage capacity of 1258.78 cmtr. It was constructucted at a cost of about 299.60 lakhs in 1977.

Length of the dam is 1,170 m, height of the dam is 25 m (above the river bed level), total water storage is 1.26 TMC, there is a link channel between Suvarnavathi to its small brother dam called Chikkahole Dam, which is 3 km from Suvarnavathi dam.

Suvarnavathi Dam is the main source of water for irrigation in nearby villages, it will be full by end of the monsoon season and dry during summer season. Main water in flow to dam is from rain in the Punanjanur forest area during monsoon. Also it is the source of drinking water for wild animals as it is adjacent to the thick forest.

Attraction 
Suvarnavathi Dam is the main source of water for irrigation in nearby villages, it is full by end of the monsoon season and dry during summer season. Main water in flow to dam is from rain in the Punanjanur forest area during monsoon. Also it is the source of drinking water for wild animals as it is adjacent to the thick forest.

How to Reach 
Many bus and train services are available from Bangalore to Chamarajanagara town it is around 180 km, from Chamarajanagara town to Suvarnavathi Dam many local transport bus available.

Nearby places to visit 

Bandipura Reserve Forest
Bhavanisagar Dam
Biligiriranga Hills
Himavada Gopalaswamy Hill
K Gudi Reserve Forest
Gaganachukki and Barachukki Falls
Male Mahadeswara Hill
Satyamangalam

References 

waterresources.kar.nic.in
karnataka.com

Dams in Karnataka
Reservoirs in Karnataka
Geography of Chamarajanagar district
Tourist attractions in Chamarajanagar district
Year of establishment missing